Greatest Hits is the first compilation album by German pop singer Sasha, released by Warner Music on 1 December 2006 in German-speaking Europe.

Track listing
Regular Edition

 "Coming Home (Original Radio Version)" — 3:09
 "If You Believe (Radio Mix)" — 4:00
 "Slowly (Radio Mix)" — 4:07
 "I Feel Lonely (European Broadcast Version)" — 3:39
 "Rooftop (New Radio Version)" — 3:35
 "Owner of My Heart" — 3:41
 "This Is My Time (Radio Cut)" — 3:39
 "Take Good Care of My Baby" (Dick Brave & The Backbeats featuring Vancouver Movie Orchestra) [New Radio Version] — 2:28
 "Lucky Day" — 3:17
 "Turn It into Something Special (Radio Cut)" — 3:34
 "Let Me Be the One (Radio Version)" — 3:37
 "Here She Comes Again" — 3:55
 "I'm Still Waitin' (Unreleased Version)'"  — 4:02
 "Chemical Reaction (New Radio Mix) (No Ragga)" — 3:27
 "Walk This Way" (Dick Brave & The Backbeats) — 2:49
 "We Can Leave the World (Radio Cut)" — 3:49
 "Goodbye (New Radio Mix)" — 3:44

Special edition (2CD) 
CD1 same as regular edition

CD2

 If You Believe (New Version 2006)
 I Feel Lonely (New Version 2006)
 We Can Leave The World (New Version 2006)
 This Is My Time (New Version 2006)
 Rooftop (Remixed New Version 2006)
 Happy X-mas (War Is Over)
 Coming Home (X-mas Version)
 Rooftop (Live 2006)
 Slowly (Live 2006)

Platin edition (CD+DVD)
8 June 2007 released

CD same as regular edition

DVD

 If you believe (Live mit dem Babelsberger Filmorchester)
 Miracle mile (Live mit dem Babelsberger Filmorchester)
 I feel lonely (Live mit dem Babelsberger Filmorchester)
 Good things (Live mit dem Babelsberger Filmorchester)
 Slowly
 Breathe
 This is my time
 Owner of my heart  (Live mit dem Babelsberger Filmorchester)
 We can leave the world (Live mit dem Babelsberger Filmorchester)
 Turn It Into Something Special  (Live mit dem Babelsberger Filmorchester)
 Rooftop  (Live mit dem Babelsberger Filmorchester)
 Goodbye  (Live mit dem Babelsberger Filmorchester)
 Coming Home
 How do you know (Live mit dem Babelsberger Filmorchester)

New edition (2CD)
16 November 2007 released

CD1

 Hide & Seek

CD1 tracks 2–18 same as regular edition

CD2 same as special edition CD2

Coming home was the 85th best-selling single of 2007.

Lucky Day was the 66th best-selling single of 2007.

Charts

Weekly charts

Year-end charts

Certifications

References

External links
 Sasha.de — official site

Sasha (German singer) albums
2006 greatest hits albums